The MCV DD103 is a low-floor double-decker bus body built by MCV Bus and Coach built on the Volvo B9TL chassis. Most of them are built as open top variants instead of closed top buses.

The MCV DD103 was launched in May 2011. One was trialled in London by Docklands Buses and London United.

Golden Tours of London ordered nine in 2012, with six being open-top variants. A further 11 were delivered in 2014, all but one being open-top variants. Others are operated by Wessex Bus.

See also
MCV DD102, similar bodywork mounted on VDL DB300 chassis

References

External links

Flickr gallery
Brochure MCV

Low-floor buses
Double-decker buses
Open-top buses
Vehicles introduced in 2011